The 2018 Eastern Intercollegiate Volleyball Association Tournament is the men's volleyball tournament for the Eastern Intercollegiate Volleyball Association during the 2018 NCAA Division I & II men's volleyball season. It is being from April 19 through April 21, 2018 at George Mason University's Recreation and Athletic Complex. The winner receives The Association's automatic bid to the 2018 NCAA Volleyball Tournament.

Seeds
The top four teams qualify for the tournament, with the highest seed hosting each round. Teams were seeded by record within the conference, with a tiebreaker system to seed teams with identical conference records.

Schedule and results

Bracket

References

2018 Eastern Intercollegiate Volleyball Association season
2018 NCAA Division I & II men's volleyball season
Volleyball competitions in the United States